The Unidad Deportiva Minera Fresnillo is a multi-use stadium in Fresnillo, Zacatecas, Mexico.  It is currently used mostly for football matches and is the home stadium for Mineros de Fresnillo.  The stadium has a capacity of 6,000 people.

References

External links

Sports venues in Zacatecas
Unidad Deportiva Minera Fresnillo
Athletics (track and field) venues in Mexico